Mount Matz is a mountain,  high, at the west side of the terminus of Anderton Glacier, forming the end of a ridge descending south from the Eisenhower Range to Reeves Glacier, in Victoria Land, Antarctica. It was mapped by the United States Geological Survey from surveys and U.S. Navy air photos, 1955–63, and was named by the Advisory Committee on Antarctic Names for David B. Matz, a geologist at McMurdo Station in the 1965–66 season.

References

Mountains of Victoria Land
Scott Coast